This is a list of destroyer classes of the Royal Navy of the United Kingdom, organised chronologically by entry into service.

Torpedo boat destroyers 
In 1913, the surviving members of the large heterogeneous array of older 27-knot and 30-knot torpedo boat destroyer types (all six of the original 26-knot ships had been disposed of by the end of 1912) were organised into the A, B, C and D classes according to their design speed and the number of funnels they possessed. All were of a "turtle-back" design and, excepting a few "builder's specials", powered by reciprocating engines. It should be stressed that these A to D class designations did not exist before 1913, and only applied to those "turtle-backed" destroyers surviving to that time.

 "26-knotter" types
 Daring class: 2 ships, 1893–1894
 Havock class: 2 ships, 1893
 Ferret class: 2 ships, 1893–1894
 A class; (27-knot classes)
 Ardent class: 3 ships, 1894–1895
 Charger class: 3 ships, 1894
 Rocket class: 3 ships, 1894
 Hardy class: 2 ships, 1895
 Conflict class: 3 ships, 1894–1895
 Fervent class: 2 ships, 1895
 Janus class: 3 ships, 1895
 Sturgeon class: 3 ships, 1894–1895
 Salmon class: 2 ships, 1895
 Swordfish class: 2 ships, 1895
 Banshee class: 3 ships, 1894
 Handy class: 3 ships, 1895
 Sunfish class: 3 ships, 1895
 Zebra class: 1 ship, 1895
 B class (4-funnelled, 30-knot classes)
 Quail class: 4 ships, 1895
 Earnest class: 6 ships, 1896–1897
 Spiteful class: 2 ships, 1899
 Myrmidon class: 2 ships, 1900
 C class (3-funnelled, 30-knot classes)
 Star class: 6 ships, 1896–1897
 Avon class: 3 ships, 1896–1897
 Brazen class: 4 ships, 1896–1898
 Violet class: 2 ships, 1897
 Mermaid class: 2 ships, 1897–1898
 Gipsy class: 3 ships, 1897
 Bullfinch class: 3 ships, 1898
 Fawn class: 6 ships, 1897–1899
 Falcon class: 2 ships, 1899–1900
 Greyhound class: 3 ships, 1900–1901
 Thorn class: 3 ships, purchased 1901
 Hawthorn special type: 2 ships, 1899, steam turbine specials
 Thornycroft special: 1 ship, 1898
 Armstrong-Whitworth special,: 1 ship, 1900
 D class; (2-funnelled, 30-knot classes) Unlike the A, B and C classes, the D class comprised a series of similar ships built by one contractor (Thornycroft), although there were small variations between the batches ordered in each year.
 1893-94 Programme: 4 ships, 1896
 1894-95 Programme: 2 ships, 1897
 1895-96 Programme: 3 ships, 1897–1898
 1896-97 Programme (special type): 1 ship, 1899
 Taku type: 1 ship, 1900, ex-Chinese prize

Conventional destroyers

In 1913, lettered names were given to all Royal Navy destroyers, previously known after the first ship of that class. The River or E class of 1913 were the first destroyers of the Royal Navy with a high forecastles instead of "turtleback" bow making this the first class with a more recognizable modern configuration. 
 River or E class: 36 ships, 1903–1905 (including 2 later purchases)
 Cricket-class coastal destroyer: 36 ships, 1906–1909
 Tribal or F class: 13 ships, 1907–1909
 Beagle or G class: 16 ships, 1909–1910
 Acorn or H class: 20 ships, 1910–1911
 Acheron or I class: 23 ships, 1910–1915
 Acasta or K class: 20 ships, 1912–1913
 Swift type: 1 ship, 1907, large 36-knot flotilla leader prototype
 Laforey or L class: 22 ships, 1913–1915
 Arno type: 1 ship, 1914, Italian built for Portugal but purchased in 1915
 Admiralty M class: 74 ships, 1914–1917
 Hawthorn M class: 2 ships, 1915
 Yarrow M class: 10 ships, 1914–1916
 Thornycroft M class: 6 ships, 1914–1916
 Talisman class: 4 ships, 1914–1916, ex-Turkish purchases
 Medea class : 4 ships, 1915, ex-Greek purchases
 Faulknor-class leader: 4 ships, 1914, ex-Chilean purchases
 Marksman-class leader: 7 ships, 1915–1916
 Parker-class leader: 6 ships, 1916–1917
 Admiralty R class: 39 ships, 1916–1917
 Yarrow Later M class: 7 ships, 1916–1917
 Thornycroft R class: 5 ships, 1916–1917
 Admiralty modified R class: 11 ships, 1916–1917
 Admiralty S class: 55 ships, 1918–1924
 Yarrow S class: 7 ships, 1918–1919
 Thornycroft S class: 5 ships, 1918–1919
 Admiralty V class: 28 ships, 1916–1918
 Admiralty W class: 19 ships, 1916–1918
 Thornycroft V and W class: 4 ships, 1918
 Thornycroft modified W class: 2 ships, 1918–1924
 Admiralty modified W class: 15 ships, 1918–1922
 Admiralty type flotilla leader: 8 ships, 1917–1919
 Thornycroft type leader or Shakespeare class: 5 ships, 1917–1921

Inter-war standard classes
 Ambuscade type: 1 ship, 1926, Yarrow prototype of new design.
 Amazon type: 1 ship, 1926, Thornycroft prototype of new design.
 A class: 9 ships, 1928–1931
 B class: 9 ships, 1929–1931
 C class: 5 ships, 1930–1934
 D class: 9 ships, 1931–1933
 E class: 9 ships, 1933–1934
 F class: 9 ships, 1933–1935
 G class: 9 ships, 1934–1936
 H class: 9 ships, 1935–1937
 ex-Brazilian H class: 6 ships, 1938–1940, ex-Brazilian purchases
 I class: 9 ships, 1936–1937
 ex-Turkish I class: 2 ships, 1939–1941, ex-Turkish purchases
 Tribal class: 27 ships, 1936–1944
 J, K and N class: 24 ships, 1938–1941
 Hunt class: 86 ships (20 Type I, 36 Type II, 28 Type III, 2 Type IV), 1939–1942, "escort destroyers"
 L and M class: 16 ships, 1939–42
 Town class: 50 ships from three classes of United States Navy destroyers, built 1917–1920, transferred 1940

World War II War Emergency Programme destroyers
The following were ordered as part of the War Emergency Programme classes:
 O and P class: 16 ships, 1941–1942
 Q and R class: 16 ships, 1941–1942
 S and T class: 16 ships, 1942–1943
 U and V class: 16 ships, 1942–1943
 W and Z class: 16 ships, 1943–1944
 C class: 32 ships, (8 Ca-, 8 Ch-, 8 Co-, 8 Cr-), 1943–1945
 Battle class: 23 ships (16 Group I, 7 Group II), 1943–1946
 Weapon class: 4 ships, 1945–1946
 G class: 0 ships (8 cancelled), 1944

Post-war all-gun design
 Daring class: 8 ships, 1949–1952

Guided-missile destroyers 
 County class: 8 ships (4 Batch I, 4 Batch II), 1961–1967
 Type 82: 1 ship (Bristol, 1969) built to trial technology. Eight originally planned to operate with cancelled CVA-01 aircraft carriers.
 Type 42: 14 ships (6 Sheffield, 4 Exeter, 4 Manchester), 1971–1983
 Type 43:  project cancelled at feasibility stage in 1981 Defence White Paper
 Type 44: Subclass of Type 43 with better anti-submarine capability.
 Type 45: 6 ships, all commissioned between 2009 and 2013
 Type 83: Planned to replace Type 45 in 2030s.

See also 
 List of destroyer classes

Destroyers
 
Royal Navy
Royal Navy